China competed in the 1978 Asian Games which were held in Bangkok, Thailand from December 9, 1978 to December 20, 1978.

See also
 China at the Asian Games
 China at the Olympics
 Sport in China

Nations at the 1978 Asian Games
1978
Asian Games